The Shake may refer to:
The Shake (American rock band)
"The Shake" (Kisschasy song)
"The Shake" (Neal McCoy song)
The Shake (Laurie Johnson), an LP by Laurie Johnson, the base of what is now known as "The Avengers Theme"
 The Shake (dance), a fad dance of the 1960s

See also
Shake (disambiguation)